Benjamin Treffers (born 15 August 1991) is an Australian competitive swimmer who has participated in the FINA world championships and Commonwealth Games. Treffers is the current Australian Record Holder in the 50m backstroke event Treffers also won the title of 2012 Australian Champion in the 50m backstroke event and is trained by the Australian Institute of Sport. Coached by John Fowlie, Treffers won the title of 2011 Australian Champion in the Men's 100m Backstroke event and represented Australia at the 2011 World Championships in Shanghai, having narrowly missed out on a place at the 2010 Commonwealth Games. In 2018, Ben was appointed a brand ambassador for men's active lifestyle wear SQD Athletica. He has blogged about his preparations for the 2018 Commonwealth Games on the Gold Coast.

Treffers is the son of Mark Treffers, who won a gold medal swimming for New Zealand at the 1974 British Commonwealth Games, and the nephew of Lynne Dalzell and Paul Rowe, who swam internationally for New Zealand and Australia, respectively.

See also
List of Commonwealth Games medallists in swimming (men)

References

External links
 

1991 births
Australian male backstroke swimmers
Commonwealth Games gold medallists for Australia
Commonwealth Games silver medallists for Australia
Living people
People educated at Canberra Grammar School
People from Canberra
Swimmers at the 2014 Commonwealth Games
Swimmers at the 2018 Commonwealth Games
World Aquatics Championships medalists in swimming
Commonwealth Games medallists in swimming
Australian people of New Zealand descent
Universiade medalists in swimming
Universiade gold medalists for Australia
Universiade silver medalists for Australia
Medalists at the 2013 Summer Universiade
21st-century Australian people
Medallists at the 2014 Commonwealth Games
Medallists at the 2018 Commonwealth Games